Gijsbert d'Hondecoeter (1604 – 29 August 1653) was a Dutch landscape and animalier painter.

Hondecoeter belonged to a family of painters. His father was Gillis d'Hondecoeter and his son was Melchior d'Hondecoeter. Hondecoeter primarily painted works of barnyard fowl. Some of his works can be found at the Rijksmuseum Amsterdam. He became a member of the Guild of St. Luke in Utrecht in 1629. After he died in 1653, his brother-in-law and artist Jan Baptist Weenix continued the training of his son Melchior.

Gallery

References

1604 births
1653 deaths
Dutch Golden Age painters
Dutch male painters
Artists from Utrecht
Painters from Utrecht
Dutch bird artists